Lee Blackburn (born 1 October 1985) is an English footballer who plays for Isthmian League Division One North club Maldon & Tiptree.

Career 
Born in Hornchurch, Blackburn joined Crawley Town in 2005 from Cambridge United, where he made three appearances in League Two, having previously had spells at the Chelsea and Norwich City academies. Blackburn was released by Crawley in 2008.

Career statistics

Notes

References

1985 births
Living people
Sportspeople from Essex
English footballers
Cambridge United F.C. players
Crawley Town F.C. players
National League (English football) players
English Football League players
Association football midfielders